Anthony Oliver Scott (born July 10, 1966) is an American journalist and cultural critic, known for his film and literary criticism. After starting his career at The New York Review of Books, Variety, and Slate, he began writing film reviews for The New York Times in 2000, and became the paper's chief film critic in 2004, a title he shared with Manohla Dargis. In 2023, he moved to the The New York Times Review of Books.

Early life
Scott was born on July 10, 1966 in Northampton, Massachusetts. Both of his parents were professors. His mother, Joan Wallach Scott, is the Harold F. Linder Professor at the School of Social Science in the Institute for Advanced Study in Princeton, New Jersey. His father, Donald Scott, is a professor of American history at the City University of New York. He is a great nephew of the married acting couple Eli Wallach and Anne Jackson (his maternal grandfather was Eli's brother). Scott is Jewish. He attended public schools in Providence, Rhode Island, including Classical High School before graduating magna cum laude from Harvard in 1988 with a degree in literature.

Career

Print
Scott began his career at The New York Review of Books, where he served as an assistant to Robert B. Silvers. Scott then served as book critic for Newsday, while also serving as a contributor to The New York Review of Books and Slate. In 1993, he wrote television reviews for Variety, using the name Tony Scott.

He joined The New York Times Arts section in January 2000, following Janet Maslin's retirement from film criticism. (Maslin continues to review genre fiction for the paper.) In 2004, he became chief critic, following Elvis Mitchell's resignation. Scott and the other film critics at the Times host a video podcast on the subject of film, called Critics' Picks. On March 9, 2020, The New York Times announced that Scott would take a one-year break from his role as co-chief film critic and assume the title of critic at large, writing "bigger, cross-topic essays." 

Better Living Through Criticism, a book on art criticism by Scott, was published in 2016.

Scott is set to leave his role as a film critic in March 2023 and join The New York Times Book Review.

Television
In 2006 and 2007, Scott served as a guest critic on Ebert & Roeper during Roger Ebert's absence due to thyroid cancer.

Between 2002 and 2014, Scott made 15 appearances on Charlie Rose, where he predicted the Academy Award winners and spoke about recently released films. He often appeared alongside David Denby of The New Yorker and Janet Maslin of The New York Times and guest-hosted the program on a number of occasions.

On August 5, 2009, it was announced that Scott, along with Chicago Tribune critic Michael Phillips, would take over hosting duties on At the Movies from Ben Lyons and Ben Mankiewicz, who would no longer be involved with the show. Scott and Phillips began their duties when the show started its new season on September 5, 2009. The show was canceled after one season due to low ratings, concluding its run in August 2010.

Academia
Scott is a professor of film criticism at Wesleyan University.

Preferences

Favorites 
In a 2009 interview with Rotten Tomatoes, Scott named the following five films as his favorites of all time. 
 La Dolce Vita
 The Godfather
 Sullivan's Travels
 McCabe and Mrs. Miller
 The Man Who Shot Liberty Valance
When asked to name the best of 21st century, Scott listed along with Manohla Dargis: 

 There Will Be Blood (USA, 2007)
 Spirited Away (Japan, 2001)
 Million Dollar Baby (USA, 2004)
 A Touch of Sin (China, 2013)
 The Death of Mr. Lazarescu (Romanian, 2006)
 Yi Yi (Taiwan, 2000)
 Inside Out (USA, 2015)
 Boyhood (USA, 2014)
 Summer Hours (France, 2009)
 The Hurt Locker (USA, 2009)

Best of the year 
Since becoming a film critic, Scott has named these films the best of the year:

Personal life 
Scott is married to Justine Henning, and they have two children.

When reviewing Spike Lee’s BlacKkKlansman, Scott wrote "Maybe not everyone who is white is a racist, but racism is what makes us white".

Filmography

See also 
 New Yorkers in journalism

References

External links

 
 A. O. Scott: New York Times biography
 A. O. Scott: New York Times articles
 A. O. Scott: New York Times movie reviews

1966 births
20th-century American Jews
20th-century American male writers
20th-century American non-fiction writers
21st-century American Jews
21st-century American male writers
21st-century American non-fiction writers
American film critics
American literary critics
American people of Polish-Jewish descent
Classical High School alumni
Critics employed by The New York Times
Harvard College alumni
Jewish American writers
Johns Hopkins University alumni
Living people
The New York Review of Books people
Variety (magazine) people
Wesleyan University faculty
Writers from Brooklyn
Writers from Northampton, Massachusetts